UB2 may refer to:

 UB2, a postcode district in the UB postcode area
 SM UB-2, World War I German submarine
 UB2, Uranium diboride
 ub2, a name given, in one edition of the Pentium Pro documentation, for the ud2 instruction